Weidorje was a French zeuhl progressive rock/fusion band, formed in 1976 around former Magma members, bassist Bernard Paganotti and keyboardist Patrick Gauthier. They released one self-titled LP album in 1978 (re-released on CD with two 1978 live bonus tracks in 1992 by the French Musea label) and dis-banded around 1979.

Band members

Album personnel
 Michel Ettori − guitar (1976–78)
 Patrick Gauthier − keyboards
 Jean-Philippe Goude − keyboards 
 Alain Guillard − saxophone
 Yvon Guillard − trumpet, vocals
 Bernard Paganotti − bass, vocals
 Kirt Rust − drums

Later members
 François Ovide − guitar (1979)

References

External links
Weidorje album review (in German)

French progressive rock groups
Zeuhl
Musical groups established in 1976
Musical groups disestablished in 1979
Jazz fusion ensembles